Manhaj may refer to:
Manhaj, Iran
An Islamic term, "the methodology by which truth is reached"